This page is a list of the preserved Avonside locomotives

List

References

 Avonside
 List